The G Class are a class of diesel locomotive built by Clyde Engineering, Rosewater and Somerton for V/Line between 1984 and 1989.

History
By the early 1980s, the first generation diesels purchased by the Victorian Railways were nearly 30 years old, with an average fleet age of 20 years. In addition, 70% of the fleet was of 1,000 horsepower or less, a consequence of the historically large number of branch lines in the state.

Rationalisation of the rail freight task had also been carried out, with small freight consignments being consolidated to 'freight centres' from 1976. Moves had also been made towards the operation of block trains carrying a single commodity, rather than trains carrying a wider variety of freight. Grain became the major commodity carried by rail in Victoria, with the consulting arm of Canadian National commissioned by VicRail in 1983 to find ways of improving efficiency. Recommendations carried out included increasing train sizes to 50 bogie wagons and closing a number of branch lines.

Delivery
At the same time Australian National had placed an order with Clyde Engineering, Rosewater for 10 BL class locomotives, with an option for a further five. VicRail's chairman Alan Reiher, stepped in and negotiated for the five to be completed for the newly formed V/Line. The new diesels had a much higher axle load than the smaller T and Y class diesels used on branch lines, with these lines either being upgraded to carry heavier trains or closed. These were all delivered in late 1984.

A second order was placed for ten further units that were more tailored to V/Line's requirements. The first five were built with standard gauge bogies being delivered via Sydney. Over the next few years, members of the second batch would frequently swap gauges as needs dictated. In July 1986, through running without changing locomotives at Albury began with G class locomotives operating through to Sydney. Two further contracts for eleven and seven broad gauge units had brought the fleet up to 33 by November 1989. The first 15 were built at Clyde Engineering's, Rosewater factory with the balance built at Somerton.

Although primarily intended for hauling freight services, they were also used on passenger trains such as the Intercapital Daylight and Sydney/Melbourne Express. They rarely hauled broad gauge passenger trains.

National Rail
When National Rail commenced operating interstate services in the mid 1990s, seven (517–520, 522, 523 & 525) were leased by V/Line pending the delivery of the NR class.

The class were also used on the first privately operated train on government tracks in Australia, operated by SCT Logistics with V/Line locomotives and crews between Melbourne and Adelaide on 13 July 1995. This was extended through to Perth from October 2000.

Freight Australia
All 31 were included in the sale of V/Line Freight to Freight Victoria in March 1999. On 26 November 1999, G517 and G518 were destroyed in a head-on collision at Ararat when an eastbound grain train collided with a stationary ballast train at 70 km/h.

Freight Australia commenced a program of engine upgrades purchasing new, more powerful EMD 16-645F3B engines for some of the G class, with the old engines being used to repower X class locomotives, later recoded the XR class. The upgraded G classes were G523, G526, G529, G530, G531, G536, G541 and G543. These locos now have a power output of 3,800hp (2795kW).

In the early 2000s, Freight Australia was contracted to move freight between Melbourne and Sydney for CRT Group. The contract contained a clause that if Freight Australia was acquired by a competitor of CRT Group,  of locomotive power (calculated by the business CRT Group was offering Freight Australia) was to be transferred to CRT Group. As a result, when Freight Australia was acquired by Pacific National in 2004, G516 & G534 were handed over to QR National along with X53 & X54.

A condition imposed by the Australian Competition & Consumer Commission on Toll Holdings taking control of Pacific National was that nine locomotives be sold to SCT Logistics. This resulted in nine G class passing to SCT Logistics in February 2007.

By mid 2008, SCT Logistics had received new locomotives, and their G classes were sold to the Australian Wheat Board, CFCLA and Southern Shorthaul Railroad.

Pacific National's fleet operate on both the broad and standard gauges, with the latter often operating in New South Wales.

Features
The G class featured imported General Motors-Electro-Motive Division technology (prime mover, alternator and traction motors) on a locally designed frame and body. Major advances introduced with the class included cab air conditioning, onboard toilet, Trimount type high adhesion bogies, and Super Series wheel creep control to enable heavier loads to be hauled. The locomotives were designed to be of minimum mass, allowing a higher fuel load. The body consists of two side trusses with load bearing supports, roofbows and integral cabs. The side panels are made of fibreglass for the minimum weight, with various accessories mounted in removable roof hatches.

The first five units were fitted with carbody pressurisation, as fitted to many other Australian National locomotives for operation in the dusty outback areas they operated in. Differences in the subsequent units included the fitting of double blade windscreen wipers, lowering of the multiple-unit jumper receptacle, and the changing of the marker light orientation from vertical to horizontal. Recent years have seen many of the class fitted with on line refuelling, and working from Melbourne to Perth on the SCT Logistics service.

Fleet list

 G511-515 were originally built as BL36-40.
 G543 was built with (and still has) a desktop cab layout, being a test bed for the DL and AN class locomotives.

Model railways

HO Scale
Auscision Models has announced a future project including G Class Mark 1 locomotives – G511, 512 in early V/Line orange/grey and Freight Australia green/yellow (and 512 only in Chicago Freight Car Leasing Australia blue/grey), 513 and 514 in late V/Line orange/grey, Specialised Container Transport red/white and Southern Shorthaul Railroad yellow/black, 515 in Freight Victoria green/yellow and in Chicago Freight Car Leasing Australia blue/grey. The project also features two unannounced models, G515 in RailFirst blue/grey, and G511 in Watco black/yellow. The models are expected to be delivered either as DC, or for an additional charge they could be pre-fitted with DCC and Sound. They have been released as of March 2023.

Austrains in 2014 released models of the G class locomotive retailing at about $300 per model, and originally intended to include the option of pre-fitted DCC and Sound for an additional $100.. The range included "G 220" in VR Blue and Gold, using the body shell of a Series 1 type; in V/Line the locomotives included G 511, 518, 523 and 531. Freight Australia locomotives included G 513, 521 and 539, and the Pacific National models include 532, 535 and 540.

Powerline released models of the first two batches of G class locomotives in V/Line Orange in 1989, then with a new motor type in 1997. The first run included G 513, 515, 521 and 523 with a single motor, and 512, 514, 522 and 524. The second run had G 511, 513 with single motors and 512 with dual motors.

References

External links

 Australian Road & Track Magazine, June 1992 Going Loco: Track Test of V/Line loco G517

Clyde Engineering locomotives
Co-Co locomotives
Pacific National diesel locomotives
Railway locomotives introduced in 1984
Standard gauge locomotives of Australia
Aurizon diesel locomotives
G class
Broad gauge locomotives in Australia
Diesel-electric locomotives of Australia